Spathades is a village and a community in the municipal unit of Paralithaioi in the Trikala regional unit, Greece. It is located 16 km north of the city of Trikala, and 8 km east of Kalabaka. The community includes the small village Agios Nikolaos.

Population

External links
 Spathades on GTP Travel Pages

See also

List of settlements in the Trikala regional unit

References

Populated places in Trikala (regional unit)